PomBase is a model organism database that provides online access to the fission yeast Schizosaccharomyces pombe genome sequence and annotated features, together with a wide range of manually curated functional gene-specific data. The PomBase website was redeveloped in 2016 to provide users with a more fully integrated, better-performing service (described in ).

Data Curation and Quality Control

PomBase staff manually curate a wide variety of data types using both primary literature and bioinformatics sources, and numerous mechanisms are employed to ensure both syntactical and biological content validity.

Types of data curated include:
 Genome sequence and features (e.g. physical location of genes in the genome)
 Protein and ncRNA functions, the cellular processes they participate in and where they localize
 Phenotypes associated with different alleles and genotypes
 Specific protein modification sites and when they occur
 Human and budding yeast orthologs of S. pombe genes (manually curated dataset)
 Metadata of datasets loaded into the genome browser 
 Disease associations for when the human ortholog is known to cause disease
 Data regarding when specific genes are expressed
 Complementation data for where there is functional complementation between a fission yeast gene and a gene from another organism 
 Subunit composition of complexes

Data Organization 

Gene annotation can be viewed either at a gene-specific level (on the gene pages) or at a term-specific level (on the ontology term pages). This makes it possible to either: 
 View all annotations created for a gene, for example pat1
 View all genes annotated a term, for example cytokinesis
 View all annotations created from a specific reference, for example 26776736 Chica et al. 2016

Genome-wide datasets (including protein datasets, all annotations, manually curated ortholog lists etc) can be accessed from the datasets page. Datasets suitable for display in a genome browser and that have been loaded can be accessed via the PomBase JBrowse instance.

PomBase uses several biological ontologies to capture gene-specific information, including:
 Gene Ontology (GO) - used to describe the enzymatic functions, biological roles and cellular locations of gene products 
 Fission Yeast Phenotype Ontology (FYPO), Used to associate phenotypes with alleles of genes, in comparison to the phenotype of the reference strain 
 Sequence Ontology - used to describe DNA or protein features 
 Protein modifications - using PSI-MOD

Gene Characterization Status 

The GO slim page provides an overview of the "biological role" of all "known" fission yeast genes - these are proteins that have either been experimentally characterized in fission yeast, or in another species and transferred by orthology.

Remarkably, nearly 20% of eukaryotic proteomes, from yeast to human, are uncharacterized in terms of the pathways and processes that these proteins participate in, making it one of the great unsolved problems in biology. The role that these proteins play in biology, have not yet been discovered in any species. To aid research into these unknown proteins, PomBase maintains an inventory of uncharacterized fission yeast proteins. The priority unstudied genes list represents the subset of uncharacterized fission yeast genes that are conserved to man, making it an especially high priority research target.

Community co-Curation 
To supplement the work of the small team of professional PomBase curators, fission yeast researchers contribute annotations directly to PomBase via an innovative community curation scheme, for which an online curation tool, Canto, has been developed. Community curation is reviewed by PomBase staff, and this results in highly accurate, effectively co-curated, annotations.

PomBase maintains an annotation stats page.

Knowledgebase Updates 
 News updates on the PomBase homepage
 Posts to the research community mailing list
 NAR ([Nucleic Acids Research]) database updates
 Tweets (@PomBase)
 Facebook group
 Linkedin group

Documentation 
Pombase provides both documentation and an FAQ.

Usage of PomBase as a research tool is explored in the "Eukaryotic Genomic Databases" (Methods and Protocols) book chapter. Developments and updates are described in the NAR Database Issue papers.
 For a detailed overview of using S. pombe as a model organism see the genetics primer

References

External links 
 PomBase

Genetics databases
Genetic engineering in the United Kingdom
Medical databases in the United Kingdom
Medical genetics
Model organism databases
Science and technology in Cambridgeshire
South Cambridgeshire District
Wellcome Trust